Waldemar Bergendahl (18 April 1933 – 21 March 2022) was a Swedish film director, film editor, film producer, cinematographer and screenwriter. Bergendahl is best known as the producer behind the films based on novels by Astrid Lindgren.

Life and career 
Bergendahl was born in April 1933 in Årsunda. He grew up on a farm between Årsunda and Gästrike-Hammarby. His parents were farmers with cows, horses, chickens, pigs and many other animals. Bergendahl later went to University in Gävle. Then he moved to Stockholm.

In 1957 Bergendahl lived along with the production manager of Europafilm in an apartment in Stockholm. The production manager told Bergendahl to apply for a job at the film company. One year later, Bergendahl was part of the film crew of Miss April, a film with Gunnar Björnstrand and Gaby Stenberg in the leading roles. At that time he did know anything about film work, so he tried to help wherever he could.

Bergendahl dreamed of becoming an actor, but realized soon that he was not suitable for the job. However, he wanted to continue working in the film industry and therefore decided to work as a producer.

In 1963 Bergendahl produced the film Raven's End. In 1984 he started working with Astrid Lindgren and produced Ronia, the Robber's Daughter. His film My Life as a Dog (1988) was nominated as the best non English film for the British Academy Film Award.

Bergendahl produced around 120 films. He worked along with Astrid Lindgren, Tage Danielsson, Bo Widerberg, Lasse Hallström, Helena Bergström and many others. He always selected the employees for his films himself.

In 2010 Bergendahl was honored as a film producer by winning the Hedersguldbaggen.

Private life 
Bergendahl lived until his death in Stockholm. He has two younger sisters. In 2008 Bergendahl was diagnosed with Parkinson's.

Selected filmography

Awards & nominations 
BAFTA Awards
 1988: Best Foreign Language Film: My Life as a Dog (Nomination)
Guldbagge
 1986: Best Film (Bästa film): My Life as a Dog (Award)
 1992: Best Film (Bästa film): Agnes Cecilia – en sällsam historia (shared with Ingrid Dalunde, Nomination)
 1994: Best Film (Bästa film): The Slingshot (Nomination)
 1996: Best Film (Bästa film): En på miljonen (Nomination)
 1998: Best Film (Bästa film): Adam & Eva (Nomination)
 2010: Hedersguldbaggen as film producer (Award)

References

External links
 
 

1933 births
2022 deaths
Swedish film directors
Swedish film editors
Swedish film producers
Swedish cinematographers
Swedish screenwriters
People from Sandviken Municipality